Pender County Courthouse is a historic courthouse located at Burgaw, Pender County, North Carolina. It was built in 1936, and is a three-story, "H"-shaped, brick-veneered Georgian Revival style building.  The building consists of a hipped roofed main block flanked by projecting gable-roofed wings.

It was listed on the National Register of Historic Places in 1979.  It is located in the Burgaw Historic District.

References

County courthouses in North Carolina
Courthouses on the National Register of Historic Places in North Carolina
Georgian Revival architecture in North Carolina
Government buildings completed in 1936
Buildings and structures in Pender County, North Carolina
National Register of Historic Places in Pender County, North Carolina
Historic district contributing properties in North Carolina